Acrolepididae is an extinct family of ray-finned fish. Genera referred to Acrolepididae existed from the Early Carboniferous period to the Early Triassic epoch. They were nektonic carnivores with a fusiform body.

Acrolepididae may be closely related with the Early Mesozoic Ptycholepididae.

Included genera and species
 Genus Acrolepis Agassiz, 1843
 Acrolepis frequens  Yankevich, 1996
 Acrolepis gigas  Frič, 1877
 Acrolepis hamiltoni Johnston & Morton, 1890
 Acrolepis hopkinsi M'Coy, 1848
 Acrolepis hortonensis Dawson, 1868
 Acrolepis? laetus Lambe, 1916 [Pteronisculus? laetus]
 Acrolepis languescens Yankevich, 1996
 Acrolepis ortholepis Traquair, 1884
 Acrolepis sedgwicki Agassiz, 1843 (type species)
 Acrolepis semigranulosa Traquair, 1890
 Acrolepis tasmanicus Johnston & Morton, 1891
 Acrolepis wilsoni Traquair, 1888
 Genus Acropholis Aldinger, 1937
 Acropholis stensioei Aldinger, 1937 (type species)
 Genus Namaichthys Gürich, 1923
 Namaichthys digitata (Woodward, 1890)
 Namaichthys schroederi Gürich, 1923 (type species)
 Genus Plegmolepis Aldinger, 1937
 Plegmolepis groenlandica Aldinger, 1937 
 Plegmolepis kochi Aldinger, 1937 (type species)
 Genus Reticulolepis Westoll, 1934
 Reticulolepis exsculpta (Kurtze, 1839)

References

Palaeonisciformes
Prehistoric ray-finned fish families